Cristian Roig Mauri (born 23 July 1977) is a former Andorran international footballer.  He was capped for Andorra in 1998.

References

1977 births
Living people
Andorra international footballers
Andorran footballers
UE Sant Julià players
Association football defenders